Qush Qayahsi (also Romanized as Qūsh Qayahsī; also known as Qūsh Qayah and Qūsh Qayasī) is a village in Qeshlaq Rural District, Abish Ahmad District, Kaleybar County, East Azerbaijan Province, Iran. At the 2006 census, its population was 475, in 89 families.

References 

Populated places in Kaleybar County